Digahawatura is a village in Sri Lanka. It is located within Central Province.

Weather

Average Temperature

Precipitation

See also
List of towns in Central Province, Sri Lanka

External links

Populated places in Kandy District